James Home may refer to:

 James Home, 2nd Earl of Home (died 1633), Scottish nobleman
 James Home, 3rd Earl of Home (died 1666), Scottish nobleman
 James Everard Home (1798–1853), British naval officer